Laurel Run is a  tributary of the Bennett Branch Sinnemahoning Creek in Clearfield and Elk counties, Pennsylvania in the United States. Via the Bennett Branch, Sinnemahoning Creek, and the West Branch Susquehanna River, it is part of the Susquehanna River watershed flowing to Chesapeake Bay.

Parker Dam in Parker Dam State Park creates  Parker Lake.

See also
List of rivers of Pennsylvania

References

Rivers of Pennsylvania
Tributaries of the West Branch Susquehanna River
Rivers of Clearfield County, Pennsylvania
Rivers of Elk County, Pennsylvania